Narta is a village in Bjelovar-Bilogora County, Croatia. It is connected by the D43 highway.

References

Populated places in Bjelovar-Bilogora County